Michiel du Preez (born 3 January 1996) is a Namibian cricketer. He selected as part of Namibia's squad for the 2015 ICC World Twenty20 Qualifier tournament replacing Zhivago Groenewald. In August 2018, he was named in Namibia's squad for the 2018 Africa T20 Cup. He was the leading run-scorer for Namibia in the tournament, with 164 runs in four matches.

In October 2018, he was named in Namibia's squad in the Southern sub region group for the 2018–19 ICC World Twenty20 Africa Qualifier tournament in Botswana. In June 2019, he was one of twenty-five cricketers to be named in Cricket Namibia's Elite Men's Squad ahead of the 2019–20 international season.

In March 2021, he was named in Namibia's Twenty20 International (T20I) squad for their series against Uganda. He made his T20I debut on 3 April 2021, for Namibia against Uganda. In September 2021, du Preez was named in Namibia's squad for the 2021 ICC Men's T20 World Cup. In November 2021, he was named in Namibia's One Day International (ODI) squad for the 2021 Namibia Tri-Nation Series. He made his ODI debut on 26 November 2021, for Namibia against Oman.

References

External links
 

1996 births
Living people
Namibian cricketers
Namibia One Day International cricketers
Namibia Twenty20 International cricketers
Place of birth missing (living people)